WLAV-FM (96.9 FM) is a radio station broadcasting a classic rock music format in Grand Rapids, Michigan.  It is the dominant classic rock-formatted radio station in the market and is generally a top ten performer in the Grand Rapids ratings.

History

WLAV (AM) went on the air in 1940. In 1949, WLAV-TV 7 signed on, later becoming WOOD-TV 8.

WLAV-FM began broadcasting by 1948.  The station was a simulcast of WLAV 1340 in its early days, but began to break the simulcast in the early 1970s to first utilize the syndicated "Love" format with the likes of Brother John and then went live to play AOR music at night.  Also for a time in the early 1970s WLAV-FM played oldies under the tag line "Grand Rapids' Goldmine." In 1974, it became western Michigan's first full-time AOR station and was an instant success.

The station experienced difficulties in the 1980s. The station was sued for the death of two people and the injury of two other at its popular annual raft race event. Many of its top D.J.s began to leave: morning host Laurie DeYoung left for Baltimore, Tony Gates left in 1984, and in 1986 popular morning personality Kevin Matthews left to work in St. Louis.

By the early 1990s, WLAV-FM was doing poorly in the ratings, facing increased competition from nascent album rocker WKLQ and classic rocker WJFM. In the spring 1991 Arbitron report, WLAV, which had been a top five station just a year before and had been the #1 station 12+ as recently as fall 1987, fell completely out of the top ten stations 12+, its role as Grand Rapids' top album-rocker having been usurped by WKLQ.  On Memorial Day 1992, the station changed to a modern rock-based format, since it felt that modern rock was the direction that progressive rock and album-oriented rock radio was heading towards. Following backlash from listeners, by the fall of 1993, WLAV put the alternative format on 1340 WLAV-AM (then calling it "1340 Underground", where it ran for approximately 2 more years until a sports format replaced it). At the same time, they switched the FM signal back to a more classic rock-driven format.  They continued refining the format during the 1990s, honing it towards classic rock music from the 1960s to the 1980s, to renewed success in the ratings.

Citadel Broadcasting acquired the station from Bloomington Broadcasting (doing business as Michigan Media) in 2000. Citadel merged with Cumulus Media on September 16, 2011.

References
Michiguide.com - WLAV-FM History

External links

LAV-FM
Radio stations established in 1948
Cumulus Media radio stations
Classic rock radio stations in the United States